Stranger at My Door (also known as Dead Run) is a 1991 American made-for-television thriller drama film directed by Vincent McEveety and starring Robert Urich.

Premise
A rich city woman and murder witness on the run from her psychotic husband takes refuge in the barn of a Texas dirt farmer. The farmer is also on the run from the law and has been for years and finally must confront the police when they come for the woman.

Cast
Robert Urich as Joe Fortier
Markie Post as Sharon Dancey
James Gammon as Sheriff Bitterman
Michael Beck as Jimmy Lee Dancey
Helen Griffiths as Laverne
Nick Stahl as Robert Fortier
Ken Swofford as Lieutenant McIvers

References

External links

1991 television films
1991 films
1990s thriller drama films
American thriller drama films
CBS network films
Films directed by Vincent McEveety
American thriller television films
1990s English-language films
1990s American films